Imphal 1944 is 2014 Japanese-English bilingual feature film based on the Battle of Imphal of World War II. It was directed and produced by London based Japanese actor and filmmaker Junichi Kajioka. It was produced on the 70th Anniversary Commemoration of the Battle of Imphal (WWII) in Imphal on 28 June 2014. Notably, the film was screened in the Cannes Film Festival in 2015.

See also 
 Japan Landa Imphal
 My Japanese Niece

References 

Battle of Imphal films
Japanese-Meitei culture
2010s Japanese-language films
Films directed by Junichi Kajioka
2014 films
Japanese war drama films
Indian World War II films
2010s Japanese films